Fifield is a small town in central New South Wales, renowned for its deposits of alluvial gold and platinum, as well as the companies trying to find their source.

Fiefield Post Office opened on 6 September 1893, was renamed Fifield in 1894 and closed in 1981.

References

External links

Towns in New South Wales
Lachlan Shire